Sir (Thomas) Chester Manifold  (13 May 1897 – 6 January 1979) was prominent member of the Victorian Racing community as a successful racehorse owner and breeder. He also spent 6 years as an Victorian politician.

He was born in Camperdown to James Chester Manifold and Lilian Eva Curle. Known by his middle name (Chester). He attended Geelong Grammar School and then studied economics at the University of Cambridge. During World War I he served with the Royal Field Artillery, and was wounded at Ypres in 1917. On his return to Australia in 1920 he worked for a stock and station agency, and on 22 May 1923 married Gwenda Grimwade, with whom he had three daughters. He managed the family property at Camperdown from 1922 and was based in Lismore from 1923 until the war. From 1926 to 1941 he served on Hampden Shire Council and was president from 1938 to 1940. He was elected to the Victorian Legislative Assembly for Hampden in 1929 as a Nationalist; he was a minister without portfolio from 1932 to 1933 but retired in 1935. During World War II he served in New Guinea as a lieutenant-colonel.

Horse racing
He was active in the racing community, particularly through the Victoria Racing Club. Against strong opposition from bookmakers and churches, he persuaded the Victorian government to set up the Victorian Totalisator Agency Board (TAB), replacing illegal off-course betting with a government monopoly which funded racing and other causes. He was first chairman of the Victorian TAB from 1961 to 1969. Chester was the owner of the famous jumper Crisp that came second in the English 1973 Grand National.

Homestead
His property, "Talindert", was a successful horse stud.  The homestead  with 15 bedrooms and 1700 acres of prime farming land hosted Princess Alexandra when she visited in 1959. It was a mixed farm which besides the horse stud ran beef, sheep and dairy cows. Talindert Primary School No. 3644 block was donated by the Manifolds.

Honours
He was knighted in 1953 and made a Knight Commander of the Order of the British Empire in 1965.

Death
Manifold died in Camperdown in 1979.

References

1897 births
1979 deaths
Nationalist Party of Australia members of the Parliament of Victoria
United Australia Party members of the Parliament of Victoria
Members of the Victorian Legislative Assembly
Australian Knights Bachelor
Australian Knights Commander of the Order of the British Empire
Australian politicians awarded knighthoods
20th-century Australian politicians
Australian Thoroughbred Racing Hall of Fame inductees
People educated at Geelong Grammar School
British Army personnel of World War I
Royal Field Artillery soldiers
Sport Australia Hall of Fame inductees